Billie Glenn "Bill" Hobbs (September 18, 1946 – August 21, 2004) was an American football linebacker who played for four seasons in the National Football League for the Philadelphia Eagles and New Orleans Saints and two seasons in the World Football League for the Florida Blazers and San Antonio Wings. He was drafted by the Eagles in the eighth round of the 1969 NFL Draft. He played college football at Texas A&M.

College career
Hobbs played college football at Texas A&M University, where he was named two-time All-American linebacker (1967 and 1968), 1967 Southwest Conference Player of the Year, the 1968 Cotton Bowl Classic MVP, and National Defensive Player of the Year.

Professional career
Hobbs was drafted in the eighth round of the 1969 NFL Draft by the Philadelphia Eagles, where he played for three seasons.  He then played for the New Orleans Saints for the 1972 season.  After his NFL career, Hobbs played for the Florida Blazers and San Antonio Wings of the short-lived World Football League.

External links
 The funeral for Billy Hobbs at aggiesports.com
Obituary at Texas A&M's school paper

1946 births
2004 deaths
Players of American football from Texas
American football linebackers
Texas A&M Aggies football players
Philadelphia Eagles players
New Orleans Saints players
Road incident deaths in Texas
Motorcycle road incident deaths
People from Mount Pleasant, Texas
Florida Blazers players